Bibio femoratus is commonly known as the March fly. Bibio femoratus is one of at least 90 types of March flies, which occur in the United States and Canada. In the southeastern United States, especially around the Gulf Coast, Bibio femoratus is known as the lovebug.

General information
Bibio femoratus is a fly (Diptera) in the family Bibionidae. There are approximately 650-700 species known worldwide, with at least 90 of them in the genus Bibio. Bibio femoratus was described by the German entomologist Christian Rudolph Wilhelm Wiedemann in 1820.

Description
Bibio femoratus is medium-sized and usually black, though the thorax and legs can be orange or red. The antennae are relatively short and thick, have 10 segments and are located low on the head. The wings usually have a dark spot on the leading edge about two thirds of the way out away from the body. The adults, which are usually abundant in early Spring, are known to form copulatory swarms, hence the term lovebug. Once fertilized, the females lay their eggs randomly on soil surfaces. The larvae develop during Fall and Winter and feed on decaying organic matter.

Bibio femoratus is a slow and clumsy flier and is usually found a couple feet off the ground. They can be observed tumbling around and flailing their legs in an effort to right themselves. After synchronous emergence, Bibio femoratus forms large swarms of mating pairs. The mating pairs are joined at the abdomen and stay that way for a while. They seem oblivious and unaware of humans as a threat, and will not make any efforts to avoid sudden movements or threatening gestures.

Larval Stage 
 3/8 to 1 inch long
 white, yellowish or brown legless cylindrical body
 dark brown head
 most segments have short spine-like projections
 feed on decaying plant matter (sometimes grass roots)

Adult Stage 
 3/4 to 1 and 1/4 inches long
 dark brown to black long abdomen; red or orange thorax and legs
 small down pointed head with short 10-segmented antennae
 wings have dark spot on R1 (leading edge, 2/3 of the wing from body)
 feed mostly on liquids like water or nectar

Bibio femoratus gets its name from its bright red femurs.

References
 Triplethorne & Johnson (2004). Borror's Introduction to the Study of Insects, Brooks-Cole. 715-716
 www.itis.gov
 crawford.tardigrade.net
 www.ipm.ucdavis.edu
 ipmnet.org
 bugguide.net

External links
 Bug Guide

Bibionidae
Insects described in 1820
Taxa named by Christian Rudolph Wilhelm Wiedemann